Mayak Oktyabrya is a rural locality (a settlement) and the administrative center of Mayakskoye Rural Settlement, Leninsky District, Volgograd Oblast, Russia. The population was 586 as of 2010. There are 10 streets.

Geography 
The village is located on Caspian Depression, 120 km from Volgograd, 82 km from Leninsk.

References 

Rural localities in Leninsky District, Volgograd Oblast